Le Truel is a barrage and hydroelectric power station on the River Tarn in Le Truel in Aveyron, southern France. It is upstream and adjacent to Le Pouget power station and the tail race from Le Pouget empties above the barrage.

The barrage was built in 1959, and the station has two Kaplan turbines generating 22MW.

See also

Pinet (power station)
La Jourdanie (power station)
Renewable energy in France

References

External links

 Hydroweb Bassin Tarn-Agout in French

Buildings and structures in Aveyron
Hydroelectric power stations in France
Dams in France
Run-of-the-river power stations
Dams completed in 1959